Conus magnottei is a species of sea snail, a marine gastropod mollusk in the family Conidae, the cone snails and their allies.

Like all species within the genus Conus, these snails are predatory and venomous. They are capable of "stinging" humans, therefore live ones should be handled carefully or not at all.

Description 
Original description: "Shell small for genus, squat in form; spire low, smooth, without coronations; body whorl smooth, shiny, without sculpturing; anterior tip with few small, low cords; color bright purplish-pink to lilac, with numerous white patches and flammules; white or pale pink band around mid-body; holotype with band of dark brown and white patches around mid-body; spire white, with some specimens having scattered dark brown flammules (such as holotype); protoconch and early whorls bright pink; interior of aperture purple."

The maximum recorded shell length is 14 mm.

Distribution
Locus typicus: "North coast of Roatan Island, Honduras."

This species occurs in the Caribbean Sea off Belize and Honduras.

Habitat 
Minimum recorded depth is 2 m. Maximum recorded depth is 2 m.

References

 Petuch, E. J. 1987. New Caribbean Molluscan Faunas. 75, plate 12, figure 7–8.
 Tucker J.K. & Tenorio M.J. (2009) Systematic classification of Recent and fossil conoidean gastropods. Hackenheim: Conchbooks. 296 pp.
 Puillandre N., Duda T.F., Meyer C., Olivera B.M. & Bouchet P. (2015). One, four or 100 genera? A new classification of the cone snails. Journal of Molluscan Studies. 81: 1–23

External links
 The Conus Biodiversity website
 Cone Shells - Knights of the Sea
 

magnottei
Gastropods described in 1987